Jan Owen may refer to:
Jan Owen (poet) (born 1940), Australian poet
Jan Owen (artist) (born 1947), American artist
Jan Owen (entrepreneur) (born 1959), Australian entrepreneur